In the theory of orthogonal functions, Lauricella's theorem provides a condition for checking the closure of a set of orthogonal functions, namely:

Theorem. A necessary and sufficient condition that a normal orthogonal set  be closed is that the formal series for each function of a known closed normal orthogonal set  in terms of  converge in the mean to that function.

The theorem was proved by Giuseppe Lauricella in 1912.

References
G. Lauricella: Sulla chiusura dei sistemi di funzioni ortogonali, Rendiconti dei Lincei, Series 5, Vol. 21 (1912), pp. 675–85.

Theorems in functional analysis